iTunes Originals – Red Hot Chili Peppers is a virtual album by Red Hot Chili Peppers which was released only on the iTunes Store as part of the iTunes Originals series of digital albums. It features live versions of the band playing some of their more famous songs as well as featuring the band themselves talking about their careers. It comprises videos of their live performances for the iTunes Originals as well as interviews about their careers, featuring the members of the band and Rick Rubin. It is a video album.

Track listing
 iTunes Originals
 "Give It Away"
  Working with Rick Rubin
 "Fight Like a Brave"
  Power & Life & Purpose'                      
 "Under the Bridge" (iTunes Original Version)
  Sometimes You Just Know That It's It
 "Can't Stop"
  You Just Rocked with Your Brothers
 "Around the World" (iTunes Originals Version)
  Doing Your Own Stunts
 "By the Way"
  It's Everything
 "Can't Stop" (iTunes Originals Version)
  A Monstrously Large Rock Record
 "Dani California" (iTunes Originals Version)
  It Just Felt Like It Meant Something
 "Tell Me Baby" (iTunes Originals Version)
  Lyrics for 38 Songs Is No Joke
 "Charlie" (iTunes Originals Version)
  A Love Letter to the History of Rock 'n' Roll
 "Dani California"
  Growing into Consummate Songwriters

Notes
In the first segment ("iTunes Originals"), the band introduces themselves as different names, John Frusciante introduces himself as Anthony Kiedis, Flea introduces himself as Chad Smith, Anthony Kiedis as Hilarious J-Money Pants, and Chad Smith as Flea.
In the segment "Working with Rick Rubin", the band and Rubin are both discussing meetings that they had; however, they are referring to two separate incidents. Anthony Kiedis and Flea talk about a meeting that apparently happened in 1985 or 1986, in their recording space at EMI Records. According to Kiedis, Rick Rubin later admitted that he was shocked to see the attitude and energy coming from the band members, and did not know what to think of it. Rubin, however, mentions a later meeting with the Red Hot Chili Peppers, during which they were being signed to a new record company (Warner Bros.). Rubin ended up producing their first album with Warner Bros. (their breakthrough album Blood Sugar Sex Magik), as well as every album that followed.

2006 compilation albums
2006 live albums
Red Hot Chili Peppers
Red Hot Chili Peppers compilation albums